The Spain men's national volleyball team is the national team of Spain. The team in 2007 won the European Championship, which is the most notable result achieved by the team to date.

Results

Olympic Games

World Championship

World Cup

European Championship

World League

European League

Mediterranean Games
1975 — Seventh place
1979 — Sixth place
1983 — Sixth place
1987 —  Gold medal
1991 —  bronze medal
1993 —  Silver medal
2001 — Fifth place
2005 —  Silver medal
2009 —  Silver medal
2013 — did not participate
2018 —  Silver medal
2022 —  Silver medal

Current squad
The following is the Spanish roster in the 2017 Men's European Volleyball Championship.

References

External links
Official website
FIVB profile

Volleyball
National men's volleyball teams
Volleyball in Spain
Men's sport in Spain